Ernest Leigh (17 January 1895 – 11 October 1960) was a British gymnast. He competed in nine events at the 1924 Summer Olympics.

References

External links
 

1895 births
1960 deaths
British male artistic gymnasts
Olympic gymnasts of Great Britain
Gymnasts at the 1924 Summer Olympics
Sportspeople from Swansea
20th-century British people